This is a list of Bangladesh films that were released in 2000.

Releases

See also

2000 in Bangladesh
List of Bangladeshi films of 2001
List of Bangladeshi films
Dhallywood
Cinema of Bangladesh

References

External links 
 Bangladeshi films on Internet Movie Database

Film
Bangladesh
 2000